Dąbrowica  is a village in the administrative district of Gmina Borne Sulinowo, within Szczecinek County, West Pomeranian Voivodeship, in north-western Poland.

The settlement was founded around 1500 in forest clearing and colonization initiated by local noble families of Wolde and Glasenapp to attract German settlers. 

Before 1648 the area was part of Duchy of Pomerania of the Holy Roman Empire, 1648-1945 Prussia and Germany. For the history of the region, see History of Pomerania.

The village has a population of 30.

References

Villages in Szczecinek County